Phaseolus filiformis is a species of wild bean native to the southwestern United States and northern Mexico. Its common names include slimjim bean, slender-stem bean, Wright's Limabean and Wright's phaseolus. This plant resembles other beans in appearance, with leaves composed of lobed triangular leaflets and pink pea-like flowers. The small bean pods are 2.5 to 3.5 cm long and less than 1 cm wide.

References

External links
Jepson Manual Treatment
Photo gallery

filiformis
Flora of North America